The Handelszeitung is a German-language Swiss weekly newspaper. The paper was established in 1861 being the oldest business newspaper in Switzerland. It is controlled by Axel Springer Schweiz AG. The paper is published on Wednesdays and has a liberal political leaning.

Its head office is in Zürich. As of 2014, Stefan Barmettler was the editor-in-chief of the paper. In 2019 the circulation of Handelszeitung was 37.500 copies.

References

External links
 

1861 establishments in Switzerland
Axel Springer SE
Business newspapers
German-language newspapers published in Switzerland
Newspapers published in Zürich
Newspapers established in 1861
Weekly newspapers published in Switzerland